The 2000 Mall.com 400 was a NASCAR Winston Cup Series stock car race held on March 19, 2000, at the Darlington Raceway in Darlington, South Carolina. Ward Burton of Bill Davis Racing won the race, his second win of his career and first in five years. Dale Jarrett finished second and Dale Earnhardt finished third.

Race summary 

This race was the first Darlington race with one pit road.  Previously, teams had to use two pit roads, which introduced a decided disadvantage to those who pitted on the backstretch under caution flag pit stops.

Dick Trickle took over driving duties of the #14 Conseco Pontiac of A.J. Foyt Racing Enterprises at this race after original driver Mike Bliss failed to qualify for every race after making the Daytona 500.

The race started a few minutes earlier than anticipated as a rain storm was closing in on the track.  Thankfully, the rain would not come in time to delay the race.

The race was marred with four cautions in the first 57 laps. Steve Park made contact with Sterling Marlin and Joe Nemechek and swept up four racecars on lap 2 turn 1.  Then, on lap 9, Rusty Wallace made contact with Kenny Irwin off turn 2 that threw out the second caution, collecting Jeremy Mayfield and Jerry Nadeau in the process. The third and fourth cautions were for single-car crashes involving Ted Musgrave and Jeff Fuller.

After the Jeff Fuller crash, teams finally settled down and the race would only have one more caution for the rest of the race.  After dealing with a very loose racecar, Dale Earnhardt, Jr. spun out at turn 2 and crashed hard on the inside pit wall on lap 204. He would be okay but he was out of the race.

Once the race settled down, Ward Burton would become the dominator of the day.  He had some challenges with Dale Jarrett, Bobby Labonte, and his brother Jeff Burton.  However, Ward held off Jarrett in the final 37 laps to take his second win of his career.  He snapped a 132-race winless streak. It was his first victory in five years.  It was the first win for Pontiac at Darlington since 1963 when NASCAR Hall of Famer Joe Weatherly went to victory lane.

Failed to qualify:  Derrike Cope (#15), Ricky Craven (#50), Ed Berrier (#90), Scott Pruett (#32), Wally Dallenbach (#75)

Top 10 results

Post-race championship standings

References 

2000 NASCAR Winston Cup Series
NASCAR races at Darlington Raceway
March 2000 sports events in the United States
2000 in sports in South Carolina